Ballybofey and Stranorlar is a census town in County Donegal, Ireland, comprising the villages of Ballybofey and Stranorlar, which face each other across the River Finn. Its population at the 2002 census was 3603. The population increased to 4,852 for the 2016 census.

Ballybofey and Stranorlar can be seen from MacCumhaill Park, where Donegal plays home matches.

References

External links
 Local website

Towns and villages in County Donegal